GoldSrc is a proprietary game engine developed by Valve. At its core, GoldSrc is a heavily modified version of id Software's Quake engine. It originally made its debut in 1998 with Half-Life, and would power future games developed by or with oversight from Valve, including Half-Life expansions, Day of Defeat, and multiple games in the Counter-Strike series.

GoldSrc was succeeded by the Source engine with the releases of Half-Life: Source, Half-Life 2, and Counter-Strike: Source in 2004. However, Valve continues to support the engine with periodic updates.

Development
The basis of GoldSrc is the engine used in the video game Quake, albeit with heavy modification by Valve. While the engine served as the basis for GoldSrc, Gabe Newell has stated that a majority of the code used in the engine was created by Valve themselves. GoldSrc's artificial intelligence systems, for example, were essentially made from scratch.<ref name="Chris Bokitch">{{cite web |last=Bokitch |first=Chris |date=1 August 2002 |title=Half-Life'''s Code Basis |url=http://collective.valve-erc.com/index.php?go=q1_or_q2 |archive-url=https://web.archive.org/web/20070301012630/http://collective.valve-erc.com/index.php?go=q1_or_q2 |archive-date=1 March 2007 |access-date=12 February 2011 |website=Valve Editing Resource Collective |publisher=Valve}}</ref> The engine also reuses code from other games in the Quake series, including QuakeWorld and Quake II, but this reuse is minimal in comparison to that of the original Quake. 

In 1997, Valve hired Ben Morris and acquired , a tool for creating custom Quake maps. The tool was later renamed to Valve Hammer Editor and became the official mapping tool for GoldSrc. The engine supports skeletal animation, which allowed for more realistic body kinematics and facial expression animations than most other engines at the time of release.

Prior to the creation of the Source engine, the GoldSrc engine had no real title and was simply called "The Half-Life engine". When the need arose for Valve to work on the engine without risking introducing bugs into Half-Lifes codebase, Valve forked the code from the Half-Life engine, creating two main engine branches: one gold master branch titled "GoldSrc" and the other "Src". Internally, any games using the original branch were referred to as "Goldsource" in order to differentiate it from the second branch, which evolved into the Source engine. Eventually, "GoldSrc" became something of a moniker for the engine and was adopted as the official title externally.

Valve released versions of the GoldSrc engine for OS X and Linux in 2013, eventually porting all of their first-party games utilizing the engine to the platforms by the end of the year.

History
Half-Life seriesHalf-Life was Valve's debut title and the first to use GoldSrc. It received critical acclaim, winning over fifty PC Game of the Year awards. The game was followed up with two expansions, Half-Life: Opposing Force and Half-Life: Blue Shift, both of which ran GoldSrc and were developed by Gearbox Software. Half-Life: Decay, an expansion pack for Half-Life only released on PlayStation 2, was released in 2001 alongside Half-Life debut on the platform. Unlike other games in the series, it never received an official version for Windows, however an unofficial version of the game was released by independent developers in 2008. Half-Life: Decay was the final iteration in the Half-Life series to run on GoldSrc, with all future entries in the series using the Source and Source 2 engines.

Other Valve games
Valve developed several games using the GoldSrc engine, many of which were based on original user-made modifications. Valve's Team Fortress Classic, released in 1999, was developed primarily by two of the developers of the Quake mod Team Fortress. Counter-Strike and Day of Defeat were also originally Half-Life modifications that Valve purchased the rights to and re-released as standalone titles. Counter-Strike evolved into its own series with the debut of the Japanese arcade game Counter-Strike Neo in 2003 and Valve's own follow-up in 2004, Counter-Strike: Condition Zero, both of which run on the GoldSrc engine. Although Valve's further instalments in the series starting with Counter-Strike: Source use the newer Source engine instead, Counter-Strike Online and Counter-Strike Nexon: Zombies, two spinoff titles released by Nexon in 2008 and 2014 respectively, utilize GoldSrc as their basis.

Third-party games and modifications

The GoldSrc engine was also used for a variety of third-party games and modifications not directly developed by Valve. Rewolf Software used the engine for the game Gunman Chronicles in 2000, and the PC version of James Bond 007: Nightfire was developed by Gearbox Software using a modified version of GoldSrc in 2002.

Unofficial, community-made modifications of GoldSrc have also been produced. Notable games include Natural Selection, Cry of Fear and Sven Co-op, with Valve's Team Fortress Classic, Counter-Strike, and Day of Defeat all being based on GoldSrc mods of the same names. Cry of Fear and Sven Co-op'' have since been released for free as standalone games on Steam, both of which use a licensed derivative of the engine with their own customisations.

Games using GoldSrc

References

 
1998 software
Game engines for Linux
Id Tech
Video game engines